The Tel Aviv central bus station massacre was an attack which occurred on January 5, 2003 in which two Palestinian suicide bombers blew themselves up outside the Tel Aviv Central Bus Station in Tel Aviv, Israel, killing 23 civilians and injuring over 100.

After the attack, the Palestinian militant organization Al-Aqsa Martyrs Brigades claimed responsibility for the attack.

The attack
On Sunday, January 5, 2003, two Palestinian suicide bombers blew themselves up within 500 meters from each other, only 30 seconds apart, in a crowded area in Tel Aviv outside the Tel Aviv Central Bus Station. 23 civilians were killed in the attack and more than a 100 were injured.

The perpetrators 
After the attack the Al-Jazeera network stated that the Palestinian militant organization Al-Aqsa Martyrs Brigades claimed responsibility for the attack and said that the perpetrators were Boraq Abdel Rahman Halfa and Saber al-Nour from the city of Nablus in the West Bank.

References

External links 
 Suicide bombers kill 23, wound 100 in Tel Aviv - published in Chicago Tribune on January 6, 2003
 2 bombers kill 23 in Tel Aviv suicide attacks - published in the Washington Times on January 6, 2003
 Suicide bombings kill 23 in Tel Aviv - published on CNN on 6 January 2003
 Carnage on Tel Aviv streets - published on BBC News on 5 January 2003

Suicide bombing in the Israeli–Palestinian conflict
Terrorist incidents in Israel in 2003
Massacres in Israel during the Israeli–Palestinian conflict
Massacres in 2003
Terrorist attacks attributed to Palestinian militant groups
Terrorist incidents in Tel Aviv
Massacres in Israel
2000s crimes in Tel Aviv
January 2003 events in Asia
Attacks on bus stations
Building bombings in Israel
2003 murders in Israel